White Valley may refer to:

Canada

Rural Municipality of White Valley No. 49, Saskatchewan

United States

White Valley, Arizona, in Navajo County
White Valley, Idaho, in Oneida County
White Valley, Massachusetts, a populated place in Worcester County
White Valley, Nebraska, in Cherry County
White Valley, Pennsylvania, a populated place in Westmoreland County
Tule Valley, Utah, in Millard County (originally White Valley)